Seals & Crofts I & II is a double album re-issue of their albums, Seals & Crofts and Down Home. In early 1974, while the duo were at the peak of their popularity, Warner Bros. Records decided it would be a good investment to purchase the rights to their first two LPs on the TA label, which by that time, were out of print. Songs 1-12 were written by Jimmy Seals, except for Seven Valleys, which had some help from Dash Crofts. Songs 13-23 were written by Seals & Crofts, except where indicated otherwise.

Track listing 
"See My Life" - 3:21
"Sea Of Consciousness" - 2:36
"Seldom's Sister" - 2:41
"Not Be Found" - 2:53
"Birthday Of My Thoughts" - 4:39
"In Tune" - 3:15
"'Cows Of Gladness" - 3:25
"Earth" - 2:43
"Seven Valleys" (Seals/Crofts) - 1:36
"Jekyll And Hyde" - 1:51
"Ashes In The Snow" - 3:50
"See My Life (Reprise)" - :40
"Ridin' Thumb" - 3:53
"Hand-Me-Down Shoe" - 3:20
"Purple Hand" - 2:35
"Robin" - 1:53
"Hollow Reed" - 3:29
"Gabriel Go On Home" - 3:54
"Tin Town" - 3:14
"Today" - 3:43
"Cottonmouth" - 3:44
"Granny, Will Your Dog Bite?" (Seals) - :38
"Leave" (Seals/Trombatore) - 4:18

Charts

References

Seals and Crofts albums
Albums produced by John Simon (record producer)
1974 compilation albums